= Concrete Industry Management =

- Genre: Concrete industry
- Founded: Middle Tennessee State University (1996)
- Headquarters: Murfreesboro, Tennessee, U.S.
- Number of locations: Middle Tennessee State University; California State University, Chico; New Jersey Institute of Technology; Texas State University; South Dakota State University
- Key people: Eugene Martineau, Chairman Alan Nedza, Vice Chairman; Danny Rodgers, Treasurer; Dr. Rex Cottle, Education Chairman; Michael Philipps, Auction Sub-Committee Chairman; Brian Gallagher, Marketing Chairman; Danny Rodgers, Finance Chairman; Alan Nedza, Long Range Planning Chairman; Julie Garbini, Research Chairman Jamie Gentoso N.E. Patrons Chairman
- Website: http://www.concretedegree.com/

Concrete Industry Management (CIM) is a business program that has been developed specifically for the concrete industry to provide students with a four-year Bachelor of Science degree in Concrete Industry Management. The program gives students entering the concrete work force industry experience early in their careers. Supported by leading companies and trade associations in the concrete industry, this program benefits those participating in the concrete industry by increasing the number of qualified workers in the field.

The goal of the program is to produce broadly educated, articulate graduates grounded in basic business management, who are knowledgeable of concrete technology and techniques and are able to manage people and systems and promote products or services related to the concrete industry.

The concrete industry provides diverse career opportunities. Graduates of the CIM program are being hired for management positions throughout the concrete industry including production, material supply, research, contracting and manufacturing.

The major fundraiser is the annual CIM Auction where the goal is to raise money and awareness. The money raised from the CIM Auction benefits the CIM National Steering Committee and supports the CIM programs. On average, CIM generates about $450,000 on average from auctions.

In the United States, concrete is a $200 billion industry with 500,000 people employed in a variety of concrete careers. The people in these careers build the roads, bridges, dams and public works that keep America's infrastructure maintained. Concrete is the foundation that keeps America's office buildings, retail stores and parking structures stable. Concrete is also used to create some of the safest and most energy-efficient homes.

== History ==
Concrete Industry Management (CIM) Logo

In early 1995, the concrete industry began efforts to create the first and only four-year Bachelor of Science degree program in Concrete Industry Management (CIM). Founded in 1996, the CIM program enrolled its first two students at Middle Tennessee State University (MTSU). The popularity of the program has taken off since with more than 300 students pursuing degrees in CIM.

The Ready Mixed Concrete 2000 (RMC 2000) movement, which included education as one of its primary initiatives to improve the concrete industry, became a strong national venue to garner support for the vision of a CIM degree. Led by the RMC 2000 initiative, a group of industry champions approached the administration at MTSU with the idea of creating a bachelor's degree dedicated to the development of managers for the concrete industry. Officials at MTSU embraced the idea, contingent on the concrete industry assisting in the development of the curriculum and making a commitment to staying involved long-term by promoting and supporting the program. Industry representatives agreed and a unique partnership was formed.

The program was developed to address the need for people with enhanced technical, communication and management skills specifically suited for the concrete industry. The individuals graduating from this program will have the skills necessary to meet the growing demands of the changing concrete industry. The program gives students many advantages including entering the concrete work force with exposure to the industry early in their careers.

Available at MTSU, California State University, Chico, the New Jersey Institute of Technology, and Texas State University, the program has been successful for both the industry and the graduates. More than 400 students have graduated from CIM program. CIM graduates work for manufacturers, material suppliers, ready mix companies, contractors, testing labs, trade associations, home builders and developers.

Administrative bodies were needed within the concrete industry to manage participation, guidance, and other forms of support related to the program. A grassroots advisory group, the CIM Patrons, was formed to raise funds, promote the program, recruit and mentor students, and provide guest lectures for classes. A National Steering Committee (NSC), composed of pioneering concrete industry executives, was established to provide oversight to the CIM curriculum and supply guidance for general program direction from a national perspective. In addition to the NSC, each school that offers the CIM program has a Patron's Group that serves as a grassroots advisory group to raise funds, promote the program, recruit and mentor students, as well as provide guest lectures for classes.

In 2004, the NSC began pursuing a goal to duplicate the CIM program on a regional basis. The CIM staff and administrators at MTSU, with support from leading concrete industry associations, successfully obtained a $600,000 National Science Foundation grant to assist the industry with the expansion effort. NSC plans to eventually expand the program to about seven schools.

CIM raises money through an annual auction. In 2008, the auction raised approximately $540,000, in 2009 the auction raised $300,000 and in 2010, the event raised more than $386,000. At the most recent auction in January, 2011, the annual fundraising event raised more than $500,000.

== Curriculum offered ==
CIM graduates

CIM students practicing techniques

CIM auction

Concrete coursework covers three broad areas: concrete materials science (mix design, testing, quality control, troubleshooting, etc.), concrete construction technology and techniques (placement and finishing operations, use of new products, etc.), and applied project, production, and sales/marketing management for the concrete industry (ready mix and concrete products operations management, product/industry promotion, estimating, scheduling, personnel management, etc.). The concrete-specific courses teach the fundamentals of concrete, properties and testing, concrete construction and more. All of these courses provide much more than what is simply in the text - they emphasize problem solving, quality assurance and customer satisfaction. They utilize practical case studies and an internship to make sure the student obtains real-world experience essential to starting a successful career. Additional opportunities for growth include on-campus socials and other organized events providing industry networking and professional development.

The degree is composed of four major areas of study: general studies requirements, required support courses, major requirements of concrete-related courses and business courses. The program entails a broad range of courses, from English and history to science and mathematics. A series of required business courses such as finance, sales, marketing, management and business law are also taken throughout the program. The program entails a broad range of courses, from English and history to science and mathematics. A series of required business courses such as finance, marketing, management and business law are also taken throughout the length of the program.

The concrete industry played a major a role in the development of the curriculum. Concrete professionals and industry consultants worked with administrators to make sure the CIM Graduates are fully prepared. In addition to the CIM degree, a master's degree is available. This program was jointly developed by members of the CIM Association, representatives from the Concrete Industry Management program of the College of Basic and Applied Sciences, and faculty and administrators from the Jones College of Business. This executive type MBA in CIM will be a cohort structure for networking and sharing experiences, while fostering a collaborative learning environment. Since CIM is still a young degree program, most interest comes from industry professionals with business, liberal arts or technical degree background.

The program is18-months long and is administered in 10-week blocks. For a 36-hour program, there will be six regular 10-week terms, plus a prerequisite term made up of three business leveling courses – Accounting, Finance and Statistics. Presented by the Jennings A. Jones College of Business on the campus of Middle Tennessee State University (MTSU) in Murfreesboro, Tenn., the format includes distance learning, webinars and on-campus visits to MTSU. Academically, all participants must hold at least an undergraduate degree from an accredited institution of higher education. While participants must have at least a bachelor's degree, that degree does not have to be in business.

== Scholarships ==
Many organizations in the concrete industry offer scholarships for students interested in pursuing a Concrete Industry Management degree. The list below indicates the scholarships available. There are three scholarships available to CIM students. The first, National Precast Concrete Association (NPCA) Educational Foundation Scholarship, is offered to any high school student, high school graduate or current undergraduate who will be enrolling full-time in an academic institution for the year beginning in September following the date of application and whose course of study is in an academic field related to the building, construction or precast concrete industry. Scholarships will not exceed four years and are awarded in the amount of $1,000 per academic year.

The Concrete Plant Manufacturers Bureau (CPMB) Scholarship is offered to a deserving student in the MTSU CIM program (minimum 3.0 GPA). The scholarship, which will provide $2,500 per semester for two semesters, will be available beginning with the Fall 2008 semester. The recipient will be selected by the CIM faculty.

The final scholarship, Wisconsin Ready-Mixed Concrete Association Scholarship is offered to residents from the state of Wisconsin, the Upper Peninsula of Michigan and members or family members of the Wisconsin Ready Mixed Concrete Association.

== Locations ==
There are now five locations with CIM programs in place. They are Middle Tennessee State University, Texas State University, New Jersey Institute of Technology, California State University, Chico and South Dakota State University
